Samuel Weston (died 1716) was an English politician who served as Member of Parliament for Poole from 1705 to 1708. He was a known loyal supporter of the Whig Junto. He later served as Mayor of Poole from 1710 to 1712.

See also 

 List of members of the House of Commons at Westminster 1705–1708

References 

1716 deaths
English MPs 1705–1707
British MPs 1707–1708
Mayors of Poole
People from Poole
Members of the Parliament of Great Britain for English constituencies
Whig (British political party) MPs for English constituencies